Port Darwin is a port in the Northern Territory of Australia

Port Darwin may also refer to.

Electoral division of Port Darwin, an electorate  in the Northern Territory of Australia
Port Darwin FC, a soccer club in the Northern Territory of Australia
Another name for Darwin, Falkland Islands

See also
Darwin (disambiguation)